Christer Hammargren (born 5 October 1944) is a Swedish former professional motocross racer. He competed in the Motocross World Championships from 1967 to 1976.

Biography
Hammargren was born in Vaggeryd, Jönköping County, Sweden. He was one of the top riders in the Motocross Grand Prix World Championships during the 1970s. 
He competed in the FIM Motocross World Championships from 1967 to 1976. His best season was in 1970 when, as a member of the Husqvarna factory racing team, he won two motos and finished the year in fifth place in the 500cc motocross world championships. Hammargren was a member of the Swedish team that won the 1968 Trophée des Nations. He was also a member of two victorious Swedish teams at the Motocross des Nations in 1970 and 1971.

References 

Living people
1944 births
People from Vaggeryd Municipality
Swedish motocross riders
Sportspeople from Jönköping County